The dusky pigeon (Patagioenas goodsoni) is a species of bird in the family Columbidae. It is found in Colombia and Ecuador.

Taxonomy and systematics

The dusky pigeon is most closely related to the ruddy pigeon (P. subvinacea), short-billed pigeon (P. nigrirostris), and plumbeous pigeon (P. plumbia), and they have sometimes been placed in subgenus Oenoenas. The dusky pigeon is monotypic.

Description

Its head, throat, and breast are gray or purplish gray. Its nape is gray glossed with purple. Its shoulders, back, and rump are olive brown or dark purplish brown. The wings and tail are bronzy gray, sometimes glossed with purple. Its eye can be any of several shades of red.

Distribution and habitat

The dusky pigeon is found in the Chocó Biogeographic Region from Colombia near the Panamanian border south to the Río Palenque in northwestern Ecuador.

Behavior

Feeding

No information on the dusky pigeon's foraging behavior or diet has been published.

Breeding

Specimens of dusky pigeon in breeding condition were taken between January and May and also in August, but no further information about the species' breeding phenology has been published.

Vocalization

The dusky pigeon's song is "a repeated phrase of three rather high-pitched coos whoah..pup..pup. Its call is "a purring, drawn out rrrrow.

Status

The IUCN has assessed the dusky pigeon as being of Least Concern. Though it has a restricted range, it is common locally within it. However, its life history is almost unknown, and "deforestation may prove to be a serious threat."

References

dusky pigeon
Birds of the Tumbes-Chocó-Magdalena
dusky pigeon
Taxonomy articles created by Polbot